Guzoni may refer to:

 Guzoni Tappeh, a village in Aqabad Rural District, Iran 
 Guzoni Tappeh-ye Bala, a village in Aqabad Rural District, in the Central District of Gonbad-e Qabus County, Golestan Province, Iran

See also 
 Guzzoni